Miguel Mario Díaz-Canel y Bermúdez (born 20 April 1960) is a politician and engineer who is the third first secretary of the Communist Party of Cuba. Díaz-Canel succeeds the brothers Fidel and Raúl Castro, making him the first non-Castro leader of Cuba since the revolution. Díaz-Canel's leadership thus represents a non-dynastic form of succession for the party as well as for the state, and the end of Castro leadership in Cuba.

Díaz-Canel has been a member of the Politburo of the Communist Party since 2003, and served as Minister of Higher Education from 2009 to 2012. He was promoted to the post of Vice President of the Council of Ministers (Deputy Prime Minister) in 2012. A year later, in 2013, he was elected as First Vice President of the Council of State. He succeeded Raúl Castro as the President of the Council of State in 2018; in December 2019 the office would evolve into President of the Republic. On 19 April 2021 Díaz-Canel assumed the reins of the Communist Party of Cuba as well, when he replaced Raúl Castro as First Secretary.

Early life
Díaz-Canel was born on 20 April 1960 in Placetas, Villa Clara, to Aída Bermúdez, a schoolteacher, and Miguel Díaz-Canel, a mechanical plant worker in Santa Clara, Cuba. He is of direct paternal Spanish (Asturian) descent; his great-grandfather Ramón Díaz-Canel left Castropol, Asturias (Spain) for Havana in the late 19th century.

He graduated from Central University of Las Villas in 1982 as an electronics engineer and thereupon joined the Cuban Revolutionary Armed Forces. Beginning in April 1985, he taught engineering at his alma mater. In 1987, he completed an international mission in Nicaragua as First Secretary of the Young Communist League of Villa Clara.

Political career
In 1993, Díaz-Canel started work with the Communist Party of Cuba and a year later was elected First Secretary of the Provincial Party Committee of Villa Clara Province (a top position higher than a governor). He gained a reputation for competence in this post, during which time it is reported that he supported LGBT rights at a time when many in the province frowned upon homosexuality. In 2003, he was elected to the same position in Holguín Province. In the same year, he was co-opted as a member of the Politburo of the Communist Party of Cuba.

Díaz-Canel was appointed Minister of Higher Education in May 2009, a position that he held until 22 March 2012, when he became Vice President of the Council of Ministers (deputy prime minister). In 2013 he additionally became First Vice President of the Council of State. As First Vice President of the Council of State, Díaz-Canel acted as deputy to the President, Raúl Castro.

Leadership of Cuba
In 2018, the 86-year-old Castro stepped down from the position as president of the Council of State and the Council of Ministers, though he retained the most powerful position of First Secretary of the Communist Party of Cuba and the commander-in-chief of the Cuban Revolutionary Armed Forces. On 18 April 2018, Díaz-Canel was selected as the only candidate to succeed Castro as president. He was confirmed by a vote of the National Assembly on 19 April and sworn in on the same day. Policy experts expected that he would pursue cautious reform of his predecessors' communist economic policies, while preserving the country's social structure. He is the first president born after the 1959 Cuban Revolution and the first since 1976 not to be a member of the Castro family.

He received a visit from Venezuelan President Nicolás Maduro just two days after his inauguration. He met with Maduro again in May 2018 in Caracas, during his first official foreign visit as head of state. In his first multinational political trip since becoming president, Díaz-Canel traveled in November 2018 to visit all of Cuba's Eurasian allies. Diplomatic meetings were held in Russia, North Korea, China, Vietnam, and Laos. Brief stopovers in the United Kingdom and France also included meetings with British parliamentarians and French leaders. In March 2019, Díaz-Canel and his wife hosted Charles, Prince of Wales and Camilla, Duchess of Cornwall in Havana as the first British royals to visit the island.

In October 2019, Diaz-Canel became the President of the Republic of Cuba, an office that was recreated that February after a series of constitutional reforms were approved in a constitutional referendum. This office replaced the one he had held since April of the previous year, which was the President of the Council of State, which was previously the head of state of Cuba. The position of President of the Council of State became a less important position and is now carried out by Esteban Lazo Hernández in his authority as the President of the National Assembly of People's Power. Diaz-Canel's reforms among other things, limited the presidency to two consecutive five-year terms and banned discrimination based on gender, gender identity or sexual orientation. His government also reformed the country's Family Code in 2022, after a referendum was approved, which, among other things, legalised same-sex marriage, same-sex adoption and altruistic surrogacy. These policies have been described as the "most progressive" in Latin America.

His administration has been controversial for its suppression of dissent, particularly surrounding the 11th of July protests triggered by the worsening of the COVID-19 pandemic, and his suggestion to combat the country's food crisis with pizza, guarapo and lemonade, the government's decision to change the currency system and the general scarcity of basic necessities such as food or medicine. Díaz-Canel was particularly criticised for his apparently confrontational words amidst the protests, having been quoted as saying: "The order of combat has been given - into the streets, revolutionaries!"

On 19 April 2021, he officially became the First Secretary of the Communist Party, the most powerful position in Cuba, following the resignation of Raúl Castro. He is the first non-Castro to be in such position since the Cuban revolution of 1959. BBC News stated that Díaz-Canel is loyal to the Castros' ideologies.

During the 2022 Russian invasion of Ukraine, the government blamed the United States for the crisis in Ukraine and backed Russia's right to "self-defense", but did not endorse the invasion, saying the conflict should be resolved diplomatically.

State visits

As First Vice-President

As leader of Cuba

Awards
 
Dr. António Agostinho Neto Order (2019).
 : 
 Order of the Liberator, First Class (2018).
 :
 Order of Ho Chi Minh (2018).
 :
 Order of the Aztec Eagle (2023).

Personal life
Díaz-Canel has two children from his marriage to his first wife, Marta Villanueva, which ended in divorce. He currently resides with his second wife, Lis Cuesta.

On 23 March 2021, Díaz-Canel obtained a PhD in technical sciences, defending a thesis entitled "Government Management System Based on Science and Innovation for Sustainable Development in Cuba."

See also

 List of international trips made by Miguel Díaz-Canel
 List of presidents of Cuba
 List of prime ministers of Cuba

References

External links

 Official web-site of the President's Administration (in Spanish)
 Official Twitter account
 Biography by CIDOB (in Spanish)
 

|-

|-

|-

1960 births
Living people
People from Placetas
Anti-Americanism
Cuban politicians
Cuban communists
Communist Party of Cuba politicians
First Secretaries of the Communist Party of Cuba
Presidents of Cuba
Prime Ministers of Cuba
Vice presidents of Cuba
Cuban people of Spanish descent
Cuban people of Asturian descent
Recipients of the Order of Ho Chi Minh